Daniel Reed may refer to:

Daniel Reed (actor) (1892–1978), American actor, director, screenwriter
Daniel Reed (table tennis) (born 1989), British table tennis player
Daniel Reed (Canadian politician) (1858–1935), farmer and politician in Ontario, Canada
Daniel A. Reed (politician) (1875–1959), American football coach and congressman who represented the state of New York
Daniel A. Reed (computer scientist), American computer and computational scientist 
Dan Reed (born 1963), American musician and founder of Dan Reed Network
Dan Reed (director) (born 1964), British director of Leaving Neverland

See also
Daniel Read (1757–1836), composer
Daniel Read (academic) (1805–1878), educator